Kurt Eigl (born 7 March 1954) is a retired German football player. He spent ten seasons in the Bundesliga with Hamburg, Darmstadt 98, and Bayer Leverkusen.

Eigl made 138 appearances in the Bundesliga during his career and scored 20 goals. He was part of the early years of the golden era of HSV, helping the club to the DFB-Pokal in 1976, starting the final, and the European Cup Winners' Cup in 1977.

Honours
Hamburger SV
 DFB-Pokal: 1975–76; runner-up: 1973–74
 European Cup Winners' Cup: 1976–77

References

External links
 

1954 births
Living people
German footballers
Hamburger SV players
SV Darmstadt 98 players
Bayer 04 Leverkusen players
Bundesliga players
Association football midfielders